Craven is a village in the Canadian province of Saskatchewan within the Rural Municipality of Longlaketon No. 219 and Census Division No. 6. The village lies north-east of the town of Lumsden in the Qu'Appelle Valley. It sits at the confluence of the Qu'Appelle River and Last Mountain Creek. The Craven Dam is on the east side of the village.

Craven is host to an annual country music festival called Country Thunder Saskatchewan. Originally called the Big Valley Jamboree, it was first established by Father Lucien Larré as a fundraiser for his Bosco Homes for emotionally disturbed youth. A successor event, the Kinsmen Rock'N the Valley rock music festival, ran until 2004. The country music format was revived in 2005.

History 
Craven was founded in 1882 by Colonel Stone and was originally called Sussex. The original settlement was located a half a mile east from the present site. Craven incorporated as a village on April 11, 1905.

Demographics 

Notable people
 Tanner Glass, a retired NHL ice hockey player

See also

 List of communities in Saskatchewan
 List of villages in Saskatchewan

References

External links

 

Villages in Saskatchewan
Longlaketon No. 219, Saskatchewan
Division No. 6, Saskatchewan